Arnold, Lord of IJsselstein (also known as Arnoud, 1304 – 12 February 1363) was the second Lord of IJsselstein and Stoutenburg and Schout of Amersfoort and the Eem Valley.

Life 
He was a son of Gijsbrecht, Lord of IJsselstein and Bertha of Heukelom.  From 1312, he is mentioned as a knight.  Between 1314 and 1325, he held various offices in the Bishopric of Utrecht, such as Schout of Amersfoort and the Eem Valley.

In 1344, he succeeded his father as Lord of IJsselstein.  His position was confirmed by Count William IV of Holland.  He acted as a councillor for the Count of Holland between 1345 and 1348 and again from 1354 to 1357.  He tried to remain neutral during the Hook and Cod wars.  Arnold was particularly interested in the medical science and founded the medical library of the hospital in IJsselstein

He was married to Maria of Avenes, a daughter of bishop Guy of Utrecht.  They had a daughter named Guida, who married John I, Lord of Egmond.  Guida succeeded Arnold as Lady of IJsselstein.

Arnold died in 1363 and was buried in the Saint Nicholas church in IJsselstein.

References 
 G.M. Boon: IJsselstein — Uw Woonstede, 2d ed., Association of entrepreneurs de Baronie, IJsselstein, 1977, p. 71-86 

1304 births
1363 deaths
Lords of the Holy Roman Empire
Medieval Dutch nobility
People from IJsselstein
14th-century people of the Holy Roman Empire